The 2018 Conference USA Football Championship Game was played on Saturday, December 1, 2018, at Johnny "Red" Floyd Stadium in Murfreesboro, Tennessee, and determined the 2018 football champion of Conference USA (CUSA). The game featured the East Division champion Middle Tennessee against the West Division champion UAB. The game was televised by CBS Sports Network for the first time in the 13 years of the game. With sponsorship from Globe Life and Accident Insurance Company, the game was formally named the 2018 Globe Life Conference USA Championship Game.

Teams

UAB

The Blazers, in their second season after returning from a two-year hiatus, clinched at least a share of the West Division title, plus a spot in the championship game, with a 26–23 overtime win over Southern Miss on November 10. A Louisiana Tech loss to Southern Miss the following week gave UAB the outright division title. The Blazers lost 27–3 to Middle Tennessee in the final regularly-scheduled game for both teams.

Middle Tennessee

At the final week of the regular season, only two teams were in contention to clinch the East Division title, FIU and Middle Tennessee. The Panthers defeated the Blue Raiders on October 13, by three points. That would become the Blue Raiders first loss in conference play. FIU lead the division until their first conference loss against Florida Atlantic, which lead to them and Middle Tennessee to become tie for first place in the East. Both teams continued to win in conference play. For FIU to be crown winners of the division, they would have to win against Marshall, the last game of the Panthers season. The Thundering Herd upset the Panthers 28–25, which clinched Middle Tennessee the winners of the East.

Middle Tennessee vs. UAB series history
This match up will be the 7th all time meeting against the Blazers and Blue Raiders. They last played each other the week before the game on November 24. Middle Tennessee defeated UAB, the winner of the West Division, 27–3. The win secured the Blue Raiders spot to host the 2018 conference title game. After the November 24 match up, Middle Tennessee broke the tie against UAB, and now leads the all-time series 4–3.

Game summary

Scoring summary

Statistics

References

Championship Game
Conference USA Football Championship Game
UAB Blazers football games
Middle Tennessee Blue Raiders football games
Conference USA
December 2018 sports events in the United States